Scopula anfractata is a moth of the family Geometridae. It is found in China (Yunnan).

References

Moths described in 2005
anfractata
Endemic fauna of Yunnan
Moths of Asia